Pallemoni Krishnamurthy, also known as Pochiah Krishnamurthy,  (12 July 1947 – 28 January 1999) was an Indian cricketer who played in five Test matches in 1971 against West Indies and one One Day International in 1976 against New Zealand.

He toured England in 1971 as Farokh Engineer's backup, and New Zealand and West Indies in 1976 as Kirmani's deputy. He played first class cricket for Hyderabad for most of 1970s, after making debut in 1967. He batted at all 11 slots in Ranji Trophy. He is also the only batsman to be associated in a century partnership batting as number 1 and as number 11. He worked for State Bank of India and was part of their star studded side in local cricket.

References

External links
 

1947 births
1999 deaths
India Test cricketers
India One Day International cricketers
Indian cricketers
Hyderabad cricketers
State Bank of India cricketers
Indian Starlets cricketers
South Zone cricketers
Cricketers from Hyderabad, India
Wicket-keepers